The vesical venous plexus is a venous plexus situated at the fundus of the urinary bladder. It collects venous blood from the urinary bladder in both sexes, from the accessory sex glands in males, and from the corpora cavernosa of clitoris in females (via the v. dorsalis profunda clitoridis). It drains into the internal iliac veins via several vesical veins.

Anatomy 
The vesical venous plexus envelops the inferior part of the bladder and the base of the prostate.

Anastomoses 
It communicates with the pudendal and prostatic plexuses.

References

External links
 Anatomy at umich.edu

Veins of the torso